Schaeberle is a crater in the Iapygia quadrangle of Mars, located at 24.7° S and 309.9° W. It measures approximately 159 kilometers in diameter and was named after John Martin Schaeberle, an American astronomer (1853–1924).

Impact craters generally have a rim with ejecta around them, in contrast volcanic craters usually do not have a rim or ejecta deposits. As craters get larger (greater than 10 km in diameter) they usually have a central peak. The peak is caused by a rebound of the crater floor following the impact.

See also 

 Climate of Mars
 Geology of Mars
 HiRISE
 HiWish program
 Hydrothermal circulation
 Impact crater
 Impact event
 List of craters on Mars
 Ore genesis
 Ore resources on Mars
 Planetary nomenclature

References

Impact craters on Mars
Iapygia quadrangle